Maia Ruth Lee is an artist and educator.

Early life 
In 1983, Lee was born in Busan, South Korea. Lee's parents were Christian missionaries. Lee grew up in Kathmandu, Nepal.

Education 
Lee has a Bachelor of Fine Arts degree from Hongik University in Seoul, South Korea. Lee also studied at Emily Carr Institute of Art and Design in Vancouver, Canada.

Career 
As an artist, Lee has exhibited her art in New York, Los Angeles, and Montreal. Lee's first solo exhibition was at Eli Ping Frances Perkins in New York.
In 2017, while Lee was pregnant, she modeled for fashion brand Eckhaus Latta's spring 2018 show. 
Lee was a director at the arts-focused non-profit group Wide Rainbow.
In September 2018 to October 2018, Lee held a solo exhibition of her sculpture pieces at Jack Hanley Gallery.
In February 2019, Lee was selected by curators Rujeko Hockley and Jane Panetta as a participating artist in the 2019 Whitney Biennial, opening in May 2019 at the Whitney Museum Of American Art in New York City.

Personal life 
Lee's husband is Peter Sutherland, an artist.
Lee resides in Salida, Colorado as of 2020.

References

External links 
 Maia Ruth Lee at mutualart.com
 Maia Ruth Lee at Rema Hort Mann Foundation

1983 births
21st-century South Korean artists
Living people
People from Busan
Hongik University alumni